Kultubani (Asabulei) is a village in Abkhazia, Georgia.)

References
 Georgian Soviet Encyclopedia Vol. 6, p. 67, 1983.

Notes

References 

Populated places in Gagra District